The United States men's national soccer team represented the United States at the FIFA Confederations Cup on four occasions, in 1992, 1999, 2003 and 2009.

Record at the FIFA Confederations Cup

1992 King Fahd Cup

Semi-finals

Third place play-off

1999 FIFA Confederations Cup

Group B

Semi-finals

Third place play-off

2003 FIFA Confederations Cup

Group B

2009 FIFA Confederations Cup

Group B

Semi-finals

Final

Goalscorers

References

 
Confederations Cup
Countries at the FIFA Confederations Cup